Yazali is a village in Guntur district of the Indian state of Andhra Pradesh. It is located in Karlapalem mandal of Tenali revenue division.

Geography 

Demographics 

 India census, Yazali had a population of 3,103. Males constituted 51% of the population and females 49%. Yazali has an average literacy rate of 23%, lower than the national average of 59.5%; with 35% of the males and 15% of females literate. 10% of the population is under six years of age. The majority occupation of the village is agriculture.

Governance 

Yazali gram panchayat is the local self-government of the village. It is divided into wards and each ward is represented by a ward member.

Education 

As per the school information report for the academic year 2018–19, the village has 11 schools. These include 2 private and 9 Zila/Mandal Parishad schools.

See also 
List of villages in Guntur district

References 

Villages in Guntur district